The 1996 Volta a Catalunya was the 76th edition of the Volta a Catalunya cycle race and was held from 13 June to 20 June 1996. The race started in Platja d'Aro and finished in Igualada. The race was won by Alex Zülle of the ONCE team.

General classification

References

Further reading

1996
Volta
1996 in Spanish road cycling
June 1996 sports events in Europe